Saint Vincent and the Grenadines have competed at twelve Commonwealth Games, beginning in 1958. They attended every Games between 1966 and 1978, then did not participate again until 1994. They have competed in every Games since. Saint Vincent and the Grenadines have won three Commonwealth medals, but only one since returning to the Games in 1994.

Medals

References

 
Nations at the Commonwealth Games